Oleksandr Vladyslavovych Tkachenko (born 22 January 1966) is a Ukrainian journalist, CEO and politician who has served as Ukraine's Minister of Culture and Information Policy since 4 June 2020.

Prior to his Ministership Tkachenko was a Ukrainian media manager, journalist, producer and the long-term CEO of the 1+1 Media Group.

Tkachenko won a parliamentary seat in the July 2019 Ukrainian parliamentary election with the party Servant of the People.

Education 
In 1990, Tkachenko graduated from the Faculty of Journalism of Taras Shevchenko National University of Kyiv.

In 2016, he received a diploma from Harvard Business School according to the program “Business of Entertainment, Media, and Sports”.

In 2018, he completed a study at INSEAD Business School in Singapore according to the program “Value Creation for Owners and Directors”.

Management activities in the media 
In 1994‒1999 — president of Nova Mova Television Company (production studio), which produced the TV programs “Epilogue” and “Faces of the World” for UT-1 and Inter TV channels.

In December 1996, he, together with the whole team of “Epilogue”, moved to a new television and radio company “Studio 1+1”. The Television News Service (TSN), created by Tkachenko, was broadcast on January 1, 1997 with presenter Alla Mazur. At the same time, the “Epilogue” continued to appear on 1+1 TV Channel, and Tkachenko became deputy general producer of the channel.

In December 1997, he left 1+1 TV Channel.

In April 1999, he headed Novyi Kanal TV Channel, where he came by order of the then owner of the Russian Alfa-Bank. Tkachenko reformatted and made competitive Reporter News Program, inviting some members of “Epilogue” team to it: Andriy Shevchenko, Ivanna Naida, Ihor Kulias. Under his leadership, in 2000, the channel entered the top three market leaders.

From January 2000 to May 2001, he was an advisor to the Prime Minister of Ukraine Viktor Yushchenko (on a voluntary basis). In 2003, he became the informal head of the so-called Pinchuk Holding (Novyi Kanal, ICTV, STB). In August 2004, he retired from responsibility of the holding head, and in January 2005, he left Novyi Kanal TV Channel.

In 2005, he became the chairman of the management board and one of the shareholders of Odesa Film Studio and began to develop a chain of cinemas and cinema distribution.

From March to May 2008, he worked in Moscow as the Deputy General Director of REN TV under a consulting agreement. He was engaged in content programming and TV viewing grid.

Since August 2008, he has held a position of General Director of 1+1 Media Group, which includes such channels as: 1+1, 2+2, TET, PlusPlus, Curler, Unian-TV, 1+1 International and Ukraine Today, sales house Pluses and 1+1 company for the production of TV content.

In April 2014, against the background of annexation of Crimea to Russia and the armed conflict in the east of Ukraine, he called the Ukrainian TV channels to abandon the broadcast of Russian TV serials about security forces. Later, he spoke in support of a bill banning Russian films and TV serials promoted by armed and law enforcement forces.

On November 1, 2018, Russian sanctions were imposed against 322 citizens of Ukraine, including Oleksandr Tkachenko.

On August 20, 2019, he went out of business and resigned as CEO of the 1 + 1 holding.

Producer activity 
He was a producer of “Song of Songs”, “”, “Vysotsky. Thank You For Being Alive”, “At the River”.

Moreover, he was the producer of many TV serials, including “”, “Tomorrow Will Be Tomorrow”, “Hope as a Confirmation of Life”, “Polka Dot Heaven” and many others.

Journalistic activities 
1988‒1991 — editor and presenter of the weekly television program “Youth Studio “Hart” on UT-1 Channel, the Ukrainian state television channel.

1991‒1994 — correspondent of the Ukrainian representative office of Reuters British News Agency in Kyiv.

1994 — he created the weekly informational and analytical television program “Epilogue” and became its presenter.

In 1998‒1999, based on “Nova Mova” TC on the request of Inter TV Channel, he created the author's TV program in the format of interviews with international celebrities called “Faces of the World” for one television season. The guests of the “Faces” were Dalai Lama, Pinochet, Jean Chretien, Jacques Chirac and others.

During the presidential elections of 2004, he conducted a televised debate between Viktor Yushchenko and Viktor Yanukovych.

Since May 23, 2011, he had been broadcasting the TV show “Tkachenko.UA” on 1+1 Channel for several years running.

Participation in the media market reformation 
Since 2005, together with his ex-colleague Andrii Shevchenko, he became one of the activists of the creation of Public Television and Radio Broadcasting in Ukraine and one of the authors of the concept of creating Public Television (Public Broadcasting).

Political career
Tkachenko took part in the July 2019 Ukrainian parliamentary election with the party Servant of the People. He was elected  to parliament under number 9 in election list of this party. (The party won 254 seats in the election.) On 29 August 2019, Tkachenko became Head of the Committee of the Verkhovna Rada (Ukraine's national parliament) on Humanitarian and Information Policy. He was also Head of the Group for Interparliamentary Relations with Norway.

On 4 June 2020, parliament appointed Tkachenko Minister of Culture and Information Policy of Ukraine.

On 11 November 2021, Tkachenko handed over a resignation letter due to his disagreement of the decision of the Shmyhal Government to separate the Ukrainian State Film Agency from his Ministry of Culture and other (cultural) budget cuts. On 29 November, Servant of the People faction leader Davyd Arakhamia claimed that the resignation of Tkachenko was avoided after a talk between Tkachenko and Prime Minister Denys Shmyhal; Tkachenko denied this and claimed he expected his resignation would be brought to parliament.

In response to the destruction of the Ivankiv Historical and Local History Museum during the Battle of Ivankiv on 27 February 2022, and the loss of its collection of works by Maria Prymachenko, Tkachenko, requested that Russia be deprived of its UNESCO membership.

Private life
Family 

Children: daughters Oleksandra (1989) and Eva (2012), son Danylo (2015).

Wife – Tkachenko Anna, former Head of 1+1 Digital and Innovations, from January 2021 - head of the digital department of  "Kyiv.live" and "Odessa.live" TV channels.

In 1989-2009 he was married to Tetyana Gnedash, Ukrainian screenwriter and Art Forms Production's producer.

Awards and achievements 
In 2010, 2011, 2012, Tkachenko was among the TOP-200 of the most influential Ukrainians according to Focus Magazine rating. In 2015, 2016, 2017, 2018, he was among the TOP-100 of the most influential Ukrainians according to Focus Magazine rating.

See also 
 List of members of the parliament of Ukraine, 2019–24

References

External links 
 
 Verkhovna Rada (in Ukrainian)
 
 Oleksandr Tkachenko on Twitter

21st-century Ukrainian politicians
Living people
1966 births
Politicians from Kyiv
21st-century journalists
Journalists from Kyiv
Ukrainian television journalists
University of Kyiv, Journalism Institute alumni
Servant of the People (political party) politicians
Ninth convocation members of the Verkhovna Rada
Culture ministers of Ukraine
Information ministers of Ukraine
Ukrainian producers
Ukrainian editors
1+1 Media Group